Gökşen Fitik (born 11 August 2001) is a Turkish basketball player for Ormanspor and the Turkish national team.

References

External links
 Gökşen Fitik at FIBA
 Gökşen Fitik at tbf.org
 Gökşen Fitik at eurobasket.com

2001 births
Living people
Turkish women's basketball players
Botaş SK players
21st-century Turkish women